Phyllonorycter telinella is a moth of the family Gracillariidae. It is known from Spain.

The larvae feed on Teline monspessulana. They probably mine the leaves of their host plant.

References

telinella
Moths of Europe
Moths described in 2006